Mārciena parish is an administrative unit of Madona Municipality, Latvia.

Towns, villages and settlements of Mārciena parish 
 Ķepši (Kepsi)

Parishes of Latvia
Madona Municipality